Stara Zagora, formerly known as the Stara Zagora okrug, is a province of south-central Bulgaria. It is named after its administrative and industrial centre—the city of Stara Zagora—the sixth-biggest town in the country. The province embraces a territory of  that is divided into 11 municipalities with a total population, as of December 2009, of 350,925 inhabitants.

In the southeastern part of the province on the edge of Radnevo Municipality there is a coal production facility. Between 1934 and 1949, the province included parts of the present Kardzhali Province.

Municipalities

The Stara Zagora province (област, oblast) contains 11 municipalities ( - plural:). The following table shows the names of each municipality in English and Cyrillic, the main town or village (towns are shown in bold), and the population of each as of December 2009.

Demographics

The following table represents the change of the population in the province after World War II:

Ethnic groups

According to the most recent 2011 census, out of the 333,265 people, 308,106 Identified themselves:

Bulgarians: 265,618 (86.21%)
Romani: 24,018 (7.80%)
Turks in Bulgaria: 15,035 (4.88%)
Others and indefinable: 3,435 (1.11%)
A further 25,000 persons in the Province did not declare their ethnic group at the 2011 census.

Ethnic groups according to the 2001 census, when 370,615 people of the population of 370,665 of Stara Zagora Province identified themselves (with percentage of total population):
Bulgarians: 319,379 (86.18%)
Romani: 26,804 (7.23%)
Turks: 18,529 (5.00%)
Others: 5,903 (1.59%)

Religion

Religious adherence in the province according to 2001 census:

Main city 
Stara Zagora is a cultural centre of particular significance for Bulgaria as it is an ancient Thracian, subsequently Greek, Roman and Byzantine metropolis. The oldest Neolithic remains were found in Stara Zagora. The famous film of BBC The History of Europe starts with the Neolithic museum in Stara Zagora. It shows the remains of the first homes of the  people in Europe. Stara Zagora is one of the oldest cities in Europe.

In October 2004, Stara Zagora Province was awarded for having the best quality of life in Europe, together with Greater Zürich (Switzerland), and ahead of Andalucia (Spain), and Flanders (Belgium). The award was given by fDi Magazine, produced by the renowned Financial Times Group, for the region's low-cost, newly built accommodation and rich cultural heritage.

In November 2014 the Maritsa Iztok-2 power station located in the East of Stara Zgora Province was ranked as the industrial facility that is causing the highest damage costs to health and the environment in Bulgaria and the entire European Union by the European Environment Agency.

See also
Provinces of Bulgaria
List of villages in Stara Zagora Province

References

External links 
 stara zagora news
 Stara Zagora Province — the best quality of life in Europe

 
Provinces of Bulgaria